The Colomban Cri-Cri, also spelled Cricri, is the smallest twin-engined manned aircraft in the world, designed in the early 1970s by French aeronautical engineer Michel Colomban.

The name Cri-Cri comes from  the nickname of Christine, one of Colomban's daughters. 'Cri-cri' 'or 'cricri' is also the French term for the sound of a cricket or a cicada, or an informal name for the insects themselves, but it is unclear if this double meaning was intended by Colomban himself.

Design and development
Colomban designed the aircraft to be easy to build and fly, and the closeness of the two engines to each other, around the centreline, meant that it could be flown by pilots only qualified to fly single-engined aircraft because even with the complete failure of one engine, with hands and feet off the controls, the only effect would be a gentle turn. The cockpit canopy was carefully designed to direct effective airflow over the tail surfaces in this situation. The plans-built aircraft was also designed to be easy to store in a garage and tow on a trailer, with assembly and disassembly each taking only five minutes.

The Cri-Cri features a cantilever low-wing, a single-seat enclosed cockpit under a bubble canopy, fixed tricycle landing gear and twin engines mounted on pylons to the nose of the aircraft in tractor configuration. The aircraft is made from aluminum sheet glued to Klegecell foam. The aircraft is also capable of aerobatics within the limitations of twin-engined aircraft.

The first flight of the prototype was made on 19 July 1973 and within a few days it had proved to be easy to fly and capable of aerobatics, being stressed to +10g and -5g. It was powered by two Rowena 6507J single cylinder two-stroke engines, each giving  and weighing .

Variants
MC-10 Cri-Cri
Prototype and early examples
MC-12 Cri-Cri
Model with a cruising speed of 185 km/h (100 knots, or 114.9 miles per hour) and range of 500 km (310.6 statute miles, 270 nautical miles). 
MC-15 Cri-Cri
Model powered by two JPX PUL 212  engines.
MC-15 Cri-Cri Jet
Model powered by two PBS VB TJ20  turbojet engines.

Operational use
As with any homebuilt aircraft, the existing Cri-Cri planes have often been modified by their builders, departing from the original design to a varying degree, resulting in varying performance. Most versions can climb with one engine inoperative.

In June 2010, EADS partnered with Aero Composites Saintonge and the Greencri-cri Association to present an electric-powered Cri-Cri at the Green Aviation Show in Le Bourget. The modified airframe with composite components can fly for 30 minutes at 110 km/h. The aircraft uses four brushless electric motors with counter-rotating propellers, which makes the aircraft one of the world's smallest four-engine aircraft.

On September 5, 2010 Electravia accomplished a world record speed of 262 km/h (162.33 mph) for a lithium polymer-powered aircraft using a Cri-Cri with two electric motors (each producing 25 hp) during the attempt. The company claimed engine and cooling drag reductions of 46 percent versus the conventional combustion engine arrangement.

On 9 July 2015 the electric-powered Electravia version of the design flew across the English Channel hours before the Airbus E-Fan, becoming the third electric aircraft to do so. It was pulled aloft by another aircraft and did not take off on its own. The first was the MacCready Solar Challenger in 1981 and the second used electric motors powered by hydrogen.

Specifications (MC 15)

See also

References

External links

 Photo of Nicolas Charmont's Cri-Cri F-PZPR with jet engines

1970s French sport aircraft
Homebuilt aircraft
Twin-motored electric aircraft
Microjets
Low-wing aircraft
Aircraft first flown in 1973
Twin piston-engined tractor aircraft